Chairmen of the State Assembly of the Republic of Adygea

Chairman of the Supreme Soviet (from 1993: The Legislative Assembly)

Chairman of the State Assembly

Chairmen of the Council of the Republic

Chairman of the Council of Representatives

Chairmen of the State Council

Sources
Official website

Politics of the Republic of Adygea
Lists of legislative speakers in Russia